Tor Berntin Næss (born 28 August 1942) is a Norwegian diplomat.

He was born in Inderøy, and is a cand.oecon. by education. He started working for the Norwegian Ministry of Trade, and was appointed as a deputy under-secretary of state in the Norwegian Ministry of Foreign Affairs in 1989. He served as the Norwegian ambassador to Belgium from 1996 to 2000, and to Canada from 2005 to 2009; in between he was a special adviser in the Ministry of Foreign Affairs.

References

1942 births
Living people
People from Inderøy
Norwegian civil servants
Ambassadors of Norway to Belgium
Ambassadors of Norway to Canada